Penny Spencer (born 1 January 1948) is a British actress, best remembered for her performance as coquettish schoolgirl Sharon Eversleigh in the LWT television comedy series Please Sir! (1968–70). She attended Coombe Girls School in New Malden, Surrey. She appeared in the pilot episode - "Identified" - of Gerry Anderson's live-action series UFO in 1970. She also appeared in films such as The Whisperers (1967), Under the Doctor (1976) and The Playbirds (1978).

Acting roles
Georgy Girl (1966) - Kate (uncredited)
The Whisperers (1967) - Mavis Noonan
Countdown to Danger (1967) - Sue
Mickey Dunne (1967) (TV series) - Starlet (Episode: "Yes - But Can He Go the Distance?")
Man in a Suitcase (TV series) - Second model (Episode: "Variation on a Million Bucks: Part 1")
Please Sir! (1968-1970) (TV series) - Sharon Eversleigh
Dixon of Dock Green (1968) (TV series) - Karen Dewar (Episode: "The Informant")
Crossroads (1968) (TV series) - Muriel Pawcett (Episodes 1.836, 1.837, 1.838)
Mr Rose (1968) (TV series) - Secretary (Episode: "The Dead Commercial")
The Best House in London (1969) - Evelyn (uncredited)
All Star Comedy Carnival (1969 and 1971) (TV series) - Please Sir sketch
Paul Temple (1970) (TV series) - Maria (Episode: "Games People Play")
The Troubleshooters (1970) (TV series) - Poppy Mandragora (Episode: "Boys and Girls Come Out to Play")
UFO (1970) - Janis (Episodes: "Identified", "A Question of Priorities", "The Responsibility Seat")
Public Eye (1972) (TV series) - Pauline (Episode: "Horse and Carriage")
Seasons of the Year (1971) (TV series) - Ruby (Episode: "It's Cold Outside")
The Dick Emery Show (1972) (TV series) - Episode 11.8.
Dixon of Dock Green (1972) (TV series) - Girl at accident (Episode: "The White Mercedes")
All Gas and Gaiters (1972) (TV series) - Felicity Pugh Critchley (Episode: "The Bishop loses his Chaplain")
The Man Outside (1972) (TV series) - Mildred (Episode: Cuculus Canorus)
The Best Pair of Legs in the Business (1973) - Eunice
A Picture of Katherine Mansfield (1973) (TV series) - Kitty (Episode: "Life Is the Only Cure for Life ")
Lucky Feller (1976) (TV series) - Woman in street (Episode: "The Boat")
Under the Doctor (1976) - Marion Parson
The Playbirds (1978) - W.P.C. Andrews

References

External links
 
 Aveleyman.com

Living people
1948 births
British television actresses
British film actresses
20th-century British actresses